Socialville is an unincorporated community in Warren County, in the U.S. state of Ohio.

History
Socialville was originally called Mormontown, and under the latter name was built up by Mormons in the 1840s. A post office called Socialville was established in 1878, and remained in operation until 1913. By 1882, Socialville had a population of sixty.

References

Unincorporated communities in Warren County, Ohio
Unincorporated communities in Ohio